Amir Yuryevich Kashiyev (born 11 December 1989) is a former Russian football midfielder.

Career 
In the 2005–06 season Kashiyev made his first team debut for CSKA Moscow in the Russian Cup in the Round of 16 against FC Spartak Kostroma. CSKA subsequently won the cup. He made his second and last CSKA senior appearance next season in another Russian Cup game against FC Mordovia Saransk.

He played in the Russian Football National League for FC KAMAZ Naberezhnye Chelny in 2012.

International career 
Kashiyev was an integral part of the Russian U-17 squad that won the 2006 UEFA U-17 Championship.

References

External links
 
 

1989 births
Living people
Russian footballers
Association football midfielders
PFC CSKA Moscow players
FC Orenburg players
FC Dynamo Stavropol players
FC KAMAZ Naberezhnye Chelny players
FC Nosta Novotroitsk players